The 2010/11 FIS Freestyle Skiing World Cup was the thirty-second World Cup season in freestyle skiing organised by International Ski Federation. The season started on 11 December 2010 and lasted until 20 March 2011. This season included four disciplines: moguls, aerials, ski cross and halfpipe.

Men

Moguls

Ski Cross

Aerials

Halfpipe

Women

Moguls

Ski Cross

Aerials

Halfpipe

Men's standings

Overall 

Standings after 32 races.

Moguls 

Standings after 11 races.

Aerials 

Standings after 7 races.

Ski Cross 

Standings after 11 races.

Halfpipe 

Standings after 3 races.

Women's standings

Overall 

Standings after 32 races.

Moguls  

Standings after 11 races.

Aerials 

Standings after 7 races.

Ski Cross 

Standings after 11 races.

Halfpipe 

Standings after 3 races.

Nations Cup

Overall 

Standings after 64 races.

Men 

Standings after 32 races.

Women 

Standings after 32 races.

References

FIS Freestyle Skiing World Cup
2010 in freestyle skiing
2011 in freestyle skiing